C. Subramania Bharathi (born C. Subramaniyan 11 December 1882 – 11 September 1921) was a Tamil writer, poet, journalist, Indian independence activist, social reformer and polyglot. He was bestowed the title "Bharathi" for his excellence in poetry. He was a pioneer of modern Tamil poetry and is considered one of the greatest Tamil literary figures of all time. He is popularly known by his mononymous title "Bharathi/ Bharathiyaar," and also by the other title "Mahakavi Bharathi" ("the great poet Bharathi"). His numerous works included fiery songs kindling patriotism during the Indian Independence movement. He fought for the emancipation of women, against child marriage, vehemently opposed the caste system, and stood for reforming society and religion. He was also in solidarity with Dalits and Muslims.

Born in Ettayapuram of Tirunelveli district (present-day Thoothukudi) in 1882, Bharathi had his early education in Tirunelveli and Varanasi and worked as a journalist with many newspapers, including The Hindu, Bala Bharata, Vijaya, Chakravarthini, the Swadesamitran and India. In 1908, an arrest warrant was issued against Bharathi by the government of British India caused him to move to Pondicherry where he lived until 1918.

His influence on Tamil literature is phenomenal, although it is said that he was proficient in around 32, including 3 non-Indian foreign languages. His favorite language was Tamil. He was prolific in his output. He covered political, social and spiritual themes. The songs and poems composed by Bharathi are very often used in Tamil cinema and have become staples in the literary and musical repertoire of Tamil artistes throughout the world. He paved the way for modern blank verse. He wrote many books and poems on how Tamil is beautiful in nature.

Biography

C. Subramaniyan was born in a Brahmin family on 11 December 1882 in the village of Ettayapuram, Tamil Nadu to Chinnaswami Subramania Iyer and Lakshmi Ammal. From a very young age, Subramaniyan was musically and poetically inclined.  He lost his mother at the age of five and was brought up by his father who wanted him to learn English, excel in arithmetic, and become an engineer. At around the young age of 11, he was conferred the title of "Bharathi", meaning blessed by the goddess of learning Saraswati, by the Raja of Ettayapuram on seeing his excellence in poetry.  Henceforth he was known as C. Subramania Bharathi. At the age of 15 he was married to Chellamma who was seven years old. Chellama was from Kadayam town near Tenkasi. He lost his father at the age of sixteen. He went to the M.D.T. Hindu College in Tirunelveli. Bharathi was a proficient linguist, he was well-versed in Tamil, Sanskrit, Hindi, Telugu, English, French and had a smattering knowledge of Arabic.

During his stay in Varanasi, Bharathi was exposed to Hindu spirituality and nationalism. This broadened his outlook and he learned Sanskrit, Hindi and English. In addition, he changed his outward appearance. He also grew a beard and wore a turban due to his admiration of Sikhs, influenced by his Sikh friend. Though he passed an entrance exam for a job, he returned to Ettayapuram during 1901 and started as the court poet of Raja of Ettayapuram for a couple of years. He was a Tamil teacher from August to November 1904 in Sethupathy High School in Madurai. During this period, Bharathi understood the need to be well-informed of the world outside and took interest in the world of journalism and the print media of the West. Bharathi joined as Assistant Editor of the Swadesamitran, a Tamil daily in 1904. In December 1905, he attended the All India Congress session held in Benaras. On his journey back home, he met Sister Nivedita, Swami Vivekananda's spiritual heir. She inspired Bharathi to recognise the privileges of women and the emancipation of women exercised Bharathi's mind. He visualised the new woman as an emanation of Shakti, a willing helpmate of man to build a new earth through co-operative endeavour. Among other greats such as Bal Gangadhar Tilak, he considered Nivedita his Guru, and penned verses in her praise. He attended the Indian National Congress session in Calcutta under Dadabhai Naoiroji, which demanded Swaraj and boycott of British goods.

By April 1907, he started editing the Tamil weekly India and the English newspaper Bala Bharatham with M.P.T. Acharya. These newspapers were also a means of expressing Bharathi's creativity, which began to peak during this period. Bharathi started to publish his poems regularly in these editions. From hymns to nationalistic writings, from contemplations on the relationship between God and Man to songs on the Russian and French revolutions, Bharathi's subjects were diverse.

Bharathi participated in the historic Surat Congress in 1907 along with V.O. Chidambaram Pillai and Mandayam Srinivachariar, which deepened the divisions within the Indian National Congress with a section preferring armed resistance, primarily led by Tilak over moderate approach preferred by certain other sections. Bharathi supported Tilak with V. O. Chidambaram Pillai and Kanchi Varathachariyar. Tilak openly supported armed resistance against the British.

In 1908, the British instituted a case against V.O. Chidambaram Pillai. In the same year, the proprietor of the journal India was arrested in Madras. Faced with the prospect of arrest, Bharathi escaped to Pondicherry, which was under French rule. From there he edited and published the weekly journal India, Vijaya, a Tamil daily, Bala Bharatham, an English monthly, and Suryodayam, a local weekly in Pondicherry. The British tried to suppress Bharathi's output by stopping remittances and letters to the papers. Both India and Vijaya were banned in India in 1909.

During his exile, Bharathi had the opportunity to meet many other leaders of the revolutionary wing of the Independence movement like Aurobindo, Lajpat Rai and V.V.S. Aiyar, who had also sought asylum under the French. Bharathi assisted Aurobindo in the Arya journal and later Karma Yogi in Pondicherry. This was also the period when he started learning Vedic literature. Three of his greatest works namely, Kuyil Pattu, Panchali Sapatham and Kannan Pattu were composed during 1912. He also translated Vedic hymns, Patanjali's Yoga Sutra and Bhagavat Gita to Tamil. Bharathi entered India near Cuddalore in November 1918 and was promptly arrested. He was imprisoned in the Central prison in Cuddalore in custody for three weeks from 20 November to 14 December and was released after the intervention of Annie Besant and C.P. Ramaswamy Aiyar. He was stricken by poverty during this period, resulting in his ill health. The following year, 1919, Bharathi met Mohandas Karamchand Gandhi. He resumed editing Swadesimeitran from 1920 in Madras (modern-day Chennai).

Death
He was badly affected by the imprisonments and by 1920 when a General Amnesty Order finally removed restrictions on his movements, Bharathi was already struggling. He was struck by an elephant named Lavanya at Parthasarathy temple, Triplicane, Chennai, whom he used to feed every day. When he fed a  coconut to Lavanya (the elephant), the elephant attacked Bharathi. Although he survived the incident, his health deteriorated a few months later and he died early morning on 11 September 1921 at around 1 am. Though Bharathi was considered a people's poet, a great nationalist, outstanding freedom fighter and social visionary, it was recorded that there were only 14 people to attend his funeral. He delivered his last speech at Karungalpalayam Library in Erode, which was about the topic Man is Immortal. The last years of his life were spent in a house in Triplicane, Chennai. The house was bought and renovated by the Government of Tamil Nadu in 1993 and named Bharathi Illam (Home of Bharathi).

Works

Bharathi is considered one of the pioneers of modern Tamil literature. Bharathi used simple words and rhythms, unlike his previous century works in Tamil, which had complex vocabulary. He also employed novel ideas and techniques in his devotional poems. He used a metre called Nondi Chindu in most of his works, which was earlier used by Gopalakrisnha Bharathiar.

Bharathi's poetry expressed a progressive, reformist ideal. His imagery and the vigour of his verse were a forerunner to modern Tamil poetry in different aspects. He was the forerunner of a forceful kind of poetry that combined classical and contemporary elements. He had a prodigious output penning thousands of verses on diverse topics like Indian Nationalism, love songs, children's songs, songs of nature, glory of the Tamil language, and odes to prominent freedom fighters of India like Tilak, Gandhi and Lajpat Rai. He even penned an ode to New Russia and Belgium.

Bharathi's poetry not only includes works on Hindu deities like Shakti, Kali, Vinayagar, Murugan, Sivan, Kannan(Krishna), but also on other religious gods like Allah and Jesus. His insightful similes have been read by millions of Tamil readers. He was well-versed in various languages and translated speeches of Indian National reform leaders like Sri Aurobindo, Bal Gangadhar Tilak and Swami Vivekananda. Bharathi's works can be found at Tamil Wikisource Subramaniya Bharathi  and also at the open access Tamil literature repository called Project Madurai. Bharathi's works were nationalized meaning they were brought under public ownership of the government thus becoming public domain works in 1949 by the then Chief Minister of Tamil Nadu,  Omandur Ramasamy Reddy.

Bharathi describes the dance of Shakthi (in Oozhi koothu, Dance of destiny) in the following lines:

It is the opinion of some litterateurs that Bharathiar's Panchali Sapatham, based on the story of Panchali (Draupadi), is also an ode to Bharat Mata. That the Pandavass are the Indians, the Kauravas the British and the Kurukshetra war of Mahabharat that of the Indian freedom struggle. It certainly is ascribed to the rise of womanhood in society.

He is known to have said, "Even if Indians are divided, they are children of one Mother, where is the need for foreigners to interfere?" In the period 1910–1920, he wrote about a new and free India where there are no castes. He talks of building up India's defense, her ships sailing the high seas, success in manufacturing and universal education.  He calls for sharing amongst states with wonderful imagery like the diversion of excess water of the Bengal delta to needy regions and a bridge to Sri Lanka.

Bharathi also wanted to abolish starvation. He sang, "Thani oru manithanakku unavu illayenil intha jagaththinai azhithiduvom"  translated as " If one single man suffers from starvation, we will destroy the entire world".

Some of his poems are translated by Jayanthasri Balakrishnan in English in her blog, though not published.

Even though he has strong opinions about Gods, he is also against false stories spread in epics and other part of social fabric in Tamil Nadu.

In Kuyil paattu (Song of Nightingale) (குயில் பாட்டு)  he writes..

Bharathi on caste system
Bharathi also fought against the caste system in Hindu society. Bharathi was born in an orthodox Brahmin family, but he considered all living beings to be equal, and to illustrate this he performed the upanayanam for a young Dalit man and made him a Brahmin. He also scorned the divisive tendencies being imparted into the younger generations by their elderly tutors during his time. He openly criticised the preachers for mixing their individual thoughts while teaching the Vedas, Upanishads and the Gita. He strongly advocated bringing the Dalits to the Hindu mainstream.

Here he expresses the love between human beings, where a man should not see their caste. They should see them as human beings. Not only human beings, they should see them as their brothers and sisters. This means that a well-educated person knows to treat them equally and not by their caste.

Legacy

The Government of India in 1987 instituted a highest National Subramanyam Bharati Award conferred along with Ministry of Human Resource Development, annually confers on writers of outstanding works in Hindi literature.

Bharathiar University, a state university named after the poet, was established in 1982 at Coimbatore. There is a statue of Bharathiar at Marina Beach and also in the Indian Parliament. A Tamil Movie titled Bharathi was made in the year 2000 on the life of the poet by Gnana Rajasekeran, which won National Film Award for Best Feature Film in Tamil. The movie Kappalottiya Thamizhan chronicles the important struggles of V.O.Chidambaranar along with Subramanya Siva and Bharathiar with S.V. Subbaiah starring as Subramania Bharathi.
On 14 August 2014 Professor Muhammadu Sathik raja Started an Educational trust at thiruppuvanam pudur, near Madurai named as Omar -Bharathi educational trust, the name is kept to praise the two legendary poets Umaru Pulavar and Subramania Bharathiyar from Ettaiyapuram. Though these two Poets are having three centuries time interval, the divine service and their contribution to the Tamil language are made them unparallel legends. Both two poets are offered their services at vaigai river bank of thiruppuvanam. the two poets were strongly suffered by their financial status, so both of them were unsuccessful to fulfil their family members need.
Many roads are named after him, notable ones including Bharathiar road in Coimbatore and Subramaniam Bharti Marg in New Delhi. The NGO Sevalaya runs the Mahakavi Bharatiya Higher Secondary School.

In popular culture
Bharati had a critical reception from the Tamil music director Adhithya Venkatapathy through the musical duo Hiphop Tamizha which features Bharati in its logo. Many of the poems written by Bharati were used in various Tamil films in the form of songs. AVM productions was the first company to use his songs in films, "Aaduvome Palli" from Naam Iruvar (1947) was the first song inspired from Bharathi's poem. Many of the film titles were taken from his poems like Vallamai Tharayo (2008), Aanmai Thavarel (2011), Nayyapudai (2016), Nerkonda Paarvai (2019), Soorarai Potru (2020).

See also
 Tamil Wikisource Subramaniya Bharathi's works
 Project Madurai Tamil literature repository
 Bharathi (2000 film)
 Kadayam
 Tamil literature

References

Further reading

 “Subramania Barati and Tamil Modernism”
 "Fictionalizing an Untold History"

External links

 Works by Bharathi at the open access repository: Project Madurai
 Long list of works by Bharathi on the left side menu, some songs have audio files
 Songs by Mahakavi Bharathiyar
 http://www.thehindu.com/todays-paper/tp-national/tp-tamilnadu/Bharathiar-museum-in-Cuddalore-prison-to-be-thrown-open-soon/article16630552.ece
 
 Kaakai Siraginiley (காக்கை சிறகினிலே)

Tamil poets
Tamil activists
Tamil-language writers
Indian independence activists from Tamil Nadu
Hindu poets
1882 births
1921 deaths
People from Thoothukudi district
Indian reformers
Indian autobiographers
Indian male poets
Animal attack victims
Elephant attacks
Indian social reformers
20th-century Indian poets
Poets from Tamil Nadu
Brahmins who fought against discrimination
Tamil-language literature
Anti-caste activists